Can I Burn? 2 is the fifth album released by the rapper Fiend. It was released on May 13, 2003 for Fiend's own label, Fiend Entertainment and featured production from Fiend, Jazze Pha and David Banner. After two successful albums for No Limit Records, Can I Burn? 2 was his second independent release since 1995 and found mild success, peaking at #55 on the Top R&B/Hip-Hop Albums chart and #36 on the Top Heatseekers chart.

Track listing 
"See Me"- 4:04
"Stay N Ya Lane"- 4:42 (Featuring Eightball)
"Wanna Shut It Down"- 3:26 (Featuring Partners-N-Crime)
"Impekable"- 4:32
"From Round Here"- 3:26 (Featuring Snoop Dogg, Lil' Jon)
"Luv Me a P-Poppin Bitch"- 3:50 (Featuring J-Boy)
"No Glamour Story"- 2:59
"2 da Right"- 1:21
"It Ain't Hard"- 4:28 (Featuring J-Boy)
"Can I Burn?"- 4:01
"Deep Shit"- 3:12
"Hardest Thing Outchere"- 4:34
"4 N da Morinin'"- 1:10
"My Shorty"- 4:00 (Featuring David Banner)
"In Ya Face"- 5:07 (Featuring J-Boy)
"Red, Black, and Green"- 4:38 (Featuring T.B.K.S.)
"F.E. Thanks"- 5:27

2003 albums
Fiend (rapper) albums
Sequel albums
Albums produced by David Banner
Albums produced by Jazze Pha